The 1974 European Women Basketball Championship, commonly called EuroBasket Women 1974, was the 14th regional championship held by FIBA Europe. The competition was held in Italy and took place from 23 August to 3 September 1974.  won the gold medal and  the silver medal while  won the bronze.

Squads

First stage

Group A

Group B

Group C

Second stage

Championship group

8th to 13th Group

Final standings

External links 
 FIBA Europe profile
 Todor66 profile

 
1974
1974 in Italian women's sport
International women's basketball competitions hosted by Italy
August 1974 sports events in Europe
September 1974 sports events in Europe
Euro